John Gallagher (born May 27, 1977) is the former head men's basketball coach at the University of Hartford from 2010 until 2022. He was named the tenth head coach in the history of the Hartford Hawks program on April 16, 2010 by athletic director Pat Meiser.

Career

Assistant coach
Gallagher started his coaching career working as an assistant at Lafayette College and La Salle University. From 2006 to 2008 Gallagher worked as associate head coach under Dan Leibovitz, helping the Hawks to their first appearance in the America East Championship game in 2008. Hartford lost the game to UMBC 64–50. Gallagher left Hartford in 2008, and spent two years as an assistant coach under Glen Miller with the Penn Quakers. He then briefly worked as an assistant under Steve Donahue at Boston College, a position he held for less than two weeks before being offered the head coaching job at Hartford.

Head coach

2010–11 season
In his first season at the helm, Gallagher guided the Hawks to an 11–20 record, going 7–9 in league play. In the America East Tournament, Hartford upset third-seeded Maine to make an appearance in the semifinals.

2011–12 season
In 2011–12, Gallagher and the Hawks struggled in the early season with a roster featuring seven freshman, going 0-13 before finishing the year 9–9 on its way to a 9–22 record. The Hawks made the America East Tournament semifinals once again after defeating Boston University, before falling in double-overtime to Vermont for a place in the conference final.

2012–13 season
The 2012–13 season saw Gallagher guide the Hawks go 17–12 in the regular season, earning a fourth-place finish in the America East. After falling to UMBC in the America East Championship quarterfinals, Hartford accepted a bid to the 2013 CIT, losing to Rider in the first round. This was the program's first postseason appearance since its move to Division I.

2017–18 season
On January 31, 2018 Gallagher earned his 100th victory as coach of Hartford with a 79–62 win over New Hampshire. and on February 28, 2018 Gallagher was named America East Co-Coach of the year. Hartford returned to the CIT Tournament falling to San Diego in the first round. After the 2017–2018 season Gallagher signed a contract extension.

2020–21 season
During the 2020–21 season, Gallagher led the Hawks to the America East Championship, defeating UMass Lowell 64–50 earning an automatic berth in the NCAA tournament for the first time in school history. Hartford would fall to eventual National Champion Baylor in the first round.

Sudden resignation prior to 2022–23
On November 7, 2022, just one day before Hartford was scheduled to start the 2022–23 season (its final year as a Division I member), Gallagher resigned unexpectedly. In his letter, Gallagher said the school had consistently undermined the program “to the point where player safety and well-being has been jeopardized.” He cited a preseason scrimmage at Dartmouth in late October, when one of his players was injured and wasn’t immediately helped because the school did not send an athletic trainer with the team. The university initially disputed the claims of player safety.

Head coaching record

Personal life
Gallagher graduated from Saint Joseph's University in 1999, where he played basketball under head coach Phil Martelli. Gallagher currently lives in West Hartford with his wife Geneva and four children.

References

External links
 Hartford Hawks profile

1977 births
Living people
Basketball coaches from Pennsylvania
Basketball players from Philadelphia
College men's basketball head coaches in the United States
Hartford Hawks men's basketball coaches
Lafayette Leopards men's basketball coaches
La Salle Explorers men's basketball coaches
Penn Quakers men's basketball coaches
Saint Joseph's Hawks men's basketball players